Intharacha or In Racha; ; "King Indra"), extended as Intharachathirat or In Rachathirat ("King Indra of High Kings"), variably known as Nakhon In ("Indra of City") and Nakharin ("Indra of City"), was a Thai royal title historically given to rulers of Suphan Buri. It may refer to:

 Intharacha (king of Ayutthaya), the sixth king of Ayutthaya, an ancient kingdom in Thailand
 Intharacha (son of Borommarachathirat II), a son of King Borommarachathirat II of Ayutthaya, later became a ruler of Angkor Thom
 Intharacha (son of Borommatrailokkanat), a son of King Borommatrailokkanat of Ayutthaya
 Intharacha (son of Ekathotsarot), a son of King Ekathotsarot of Ayutthaya
 Intharacha (son of Prasat Thong), a son of King Prasat Thong of Ayutthaya
 Srinagarindra, the first woman to assume such a title

Thai royal titles